U Turn is a 2018 Indian supernatural thriller film written and directed by Pawan Kumar and produced by Srinivasa Chitturi and Rambabu Bandaru under the banners BR8 Creations, V. Y. Combines and Srinivasa Silver Screen. The plot revolves around the death of motorists who break a traffic rule at a particular flyover and subsequent pinning down of the culprit by an intern journalist and police inspector duo. Filmed simultaneously in Tamil and Telugu languages, it is a remake of the director's own 2016 Kannada film of the same name.

The film stars Samantha, Aadhi Pinisetty, Bhumika Chawla, and Rahul Ravindran. Principal photography commenced in February 2018 and ended in June. U-Turn is a songless film, featuring background score composed by Poornachandra Tejaswi and a promotional song composed by Anirudh Ravichander. The cinematography was handled by Niketh Bommireddy and editing by Suresh Arumugam.

The film released on 13 September 2018 and received a positive response from critics, despite becoming unsuccessful at the box office.

Plot 
  
Rachana, an intern with The Times of India, is working on an article on the incidents at a flyover. She also has a crush on the crime reporter Aditya, whose help she seeks for research material on accidents on the flyover. She finds that each day some motorists move the concrete blocks that partition the road just to take a quick U-turn and avoid traffic. They do not move the blocks back and are left to lie randomly on the road, leading to many accidents. A homeless man sitting on the flyover notes down the vehicle numbers of commuters who violate the rule to take the U-turn and gives the list to Rachana. She obtains the details of the culprits using her contact in the traffic department, with the intention of confronting them for their "shortcut" and writing an article for the paper. Her attempt to meet the first person on the list goes in vain.

Later that day, the police arrest Rachana and accuse her of killing the same person she wanted to meet. She is shocked and tells her side of the story. Though the senior police officer rejects it, sub-inspector Pradeep Nayak finds it believable and does some investigation. It is revealed that all the people whom Rachana has on her list have committed suicide. The police also noticed that they have committed suicide the same day they took the wrong "U-turn". Rachana and Nayak find that another number has been noted by the homeless man, which is to be delivered to Rachana the next day. The duo traces the address and tries to rescue the man, a lawyer, who has taken the U-turn that day. As nothing seems suspicious, both leave only to encounter the death of the lawyer, who jumps off his balcony and dies falling on the police car in which Nayak and Rachana were leaving.

Later, Rachana tries to confront the homeless man for the injuries in the fly-over. Meanwhile, she sees two young men violate the U-turn and reports it to Nayak, who first disagrees and does not believe that they would die. Later, he locks them up in an old police lock-up and sees them with CCTV cameras to save them. But one of them, who behaves like a ghost, possesses him and fights with the other, who dies. The former steals a gun of Nayak and shoots himself.  Aditya gives an article of news with incidents on the flyover. Meanwhile, Senior Inspector Chandrashekhar suspends Nayak until the investigation is over as the two men died in police custody. Rachana interviews Ritesh about accidents on the flyover. Ritesh tells about his wife Maya and their daughter Jharna, who both died in an accident on the flyover. He tells that she should find who is responsible for Maya and his daughter's death.

With no way of finding the real cause of the death of the culprits, Rachana herself takes the U-turn and waits for something to happen. She dreams of Maya and her daughter Jharna, who died in an accident due to the concrete roadblocks that were moved. In her house, Maya and Jharna are there and say that Rachana is the reason for their death. Maya, using her supernatural powers, tries to kill Rachana, but Rachana promises to find the person who was responsible for Maya's death. She wakes up and goes to Nayak's home, where she finds some pictures of the people who died by the U- turn. With the help of Nayak, she tries to find the person who moved the blocks on the day of Maya's accident. They found out the phone number and address of the man who moved the block. Rachana writes this on a balloon and leaves it on the flyover for Maya to find. Rachana calls and finds the number to be Aditya's brother's mobile number, but he shifted to the US two years back, and Aditya is using the number and his bike. Devastated, she tells Aditya that due to his negligence, a mother and daughter died. Aditya says it was not him who made the U-turn. He merely exchanged his bike with his friend. In a final twist, it is revealed that the man who moved the block was Ritesh. Maya's ghost is waiting in Aditya's house to kill him, when Ritesh, whom Rachana has informed about the incident, arrives. They save Aditya, while Ritesh sees Maya and Jharna and tells them that because of him, they died. He then tries to commit suicide by jumping off the balcony. Maya's ghost saves Ritesh and tells him that his punishment is to suffer in this world without his wife and daughter.

Cast 
 Samantha as Rachana
 Aadhi Pinisetty as SI Pradeep Nayak
 Bhumika Chawla as Maya
 Rahul Ravindran as Aditya
 Narain as Ritesh
 Aadukalam Naren as Senior Inspector Chandrasekar
 Ravi Prakash as ASI Prabhakar
 Hari Teja as Akila
 Birla Bose as Sundar
 Nagabhushana as an auto driver
 Chatrapathi Sekhar as a lawyer
 Rajashree as Rachana's mother

Production 
U Turn is a remake of the 2016 Kannada film of the same name. It was filmed simultaneously in Tamil and Telugu languages, to bank on the popularity of lead actress Samantha in the Tamil and Telugu film industries. Pawan Kumar, who directed the original, returned to direct the bilingual remake, marking his debut in Tamil and Telugu. He also made the last 30 minutes different from the Kannada original. The remake was produced by Srinivasa Chitturi and Rambabu Bandaru under the banners BR8 Creations, V. Y. Combines and Srinivasa Silver Screen. Cinematography was handled by Niketh Bommireddy, and editing by Suresh Arumugam. Filming began in February 2018 at Rajahmundry, and ended in June.

Soundtrack 
U Turn is a songless film. The film features background score composed by Poornachandra Tejaswi and a promotional song composed by Anirudh Ravichander, which was not included in the film itself. The song "The Karma Theme" which was sung by Anirudh Ravichander with Alisha Thomas on backing vocals, was released on 5 September 2018 as a promotional song for the film, and a promotional video song was released on the same day. Directed by Krishna Marimuthu, with cinematography handled by Niketh Bommireddy the music video, features Samantha and Anirudh making onscreen appearances in the video. The song was released in both Tamil and Telugu languages and turned out to become an instant hit from listeners.

Release 
U Turn was released on 13 September 2018, during Ganesh Chaturthi. Thinkal Menon of The Times of India rated the Tamil version 3 out of 5, writing "An interesting remake with enough twists and turns, and a climax that could have been more convincing."

Box office
The film collected  in overseas in first weekend. The film approximately collected  worldwide in first weekend.

References

External links 
 

2010s mystery thriller films
2010s Tamil-language films
2010s Telugu-language films
2018 multilingual films
Indian multilingual films
Indian mystery thriller films
Tamil remakes of Kannada films
Telugu remakes of Kannada films